Speaking our Language is a Scottish Gaelic learners' television programme that ran from 9 January 1993 to 22 November 1996. Running for 72 episodes through four series, the series was produced by Scottish Television (STV Studios) and presented by Rhoda MacDonald, STV's then-head of Gaelic output. It was frequently repeated on TeleG and is now repeated on BBC Alba, and all four series have been released on DVD.

The series was based on Now You're Talking, a similar Welsh-language learners' series broadcast on S4C and developed by Acen, a resource service for Welsh learners, who acted as programme consultants for Speaking our Language.

Structure

Each episode begins with Rhoda introducing where it was recorded and what it will cover. Each set of new phrases is introduced by Rhoda and then followed by some short dramatisations which show examples of how the words and phrases are used. Once an episode an extended drama (with a continuing story line through the series) is used to give a deeper example of how the vocabulary introduced in the episode can be used. The episodes are summed up during the episode and at the end with the voice over going over the phrases introduced.

References

External links
Information from MG Alba
Future episodes on BBC Alba
Program video clips with transcripts and English translations at LearnGaelic

1990s Scottish television series
1993 Scottish television series debuts
1996 Scottish television series endings
BBC Alba shows
Language education television series
Scottish Gaelic education
Television shows produced by Scottish Television